Shir Khond (also Romanized as Shīr Khond and Shīrkhand; also known as Shahr-e Khāh and Shīr Khān) is a village in Afin Rural District, Zohan District, Zirkuh County, South Khorasan Province, Iran. At the 2006 census, its population was 378, in 116 families.

References 

Populated places in Zirkuh County